Blue Mountain is the debut album by American alternative country and Southern rock group Blue Mountain. It was recorded in June 1993 and released on 4 Barrell Records, produced by the band. Writing for Allmusic, Rob Caldwell gave the album a star rating of three out of five. He said that it was less consistent than Blue Mountain's later work, but that it was essential for fans of the band.

Track listing 
 "Bud" (Cary Hudson) — 3:48
 "Let's Ride" (Hudson) — 3:44
 "Song Without a Name" (Hudson) — 3:35
 "Westbound" (Hudson) — 3:05
 "Mountain Girl" (Hudson) — 4:03
 "900 Miles" (Traditional) — 3:15
 "Soul Sister" (Hudson) — 4:58
 "In a Station" (Hudson, Pearman, Stirratt) — 4:07
 "Jimmy Carter" (Hudson) — 2:28
 "Go 'Way Devil" (Traditional) — 5:08
 "Wink" (Hudson) — 3:24

Personnel 
Music
 Matt Brennan — drums
 Cary Hudson — acoustic guitar, banjo, electric guitar, harmonica, mandolin, vocals
 Laurie Stirratt — bass, vocals
Production
 Blue Mountain — production
 Jim Hawkins — mastering
Design
 Newt Rayburn — photography and graphic design

References 

1993 albums
Blue Mountain (band) albums